A gift voucher reseller is a company or individual who purchases gift vouchers, gift certificates or giftcards from the manufacturer or owner with a discount for bulk purchase, and then sells these products on to other companies at face value, or with a discount applied for volume.

The benefits of working with a gift voucher reseller is that all of your purchases can remain with just one company, and you therefore remove the headache of dealing with many different brands, and therefore many different invoices.

Other terms used for companies that are gift voucher]resellers, are incentive agencies, brokers, and one-stop gift voucher shops.

References

Exonumia